Nicole Frances Midwin (born June 5, 1978) is an American fashion model and professional beach volleyball player.  She is well recognized around the world for her work with Playboy magazine.

Early life and education

Midwin parents are father Giorgio Midwin from Milan, Italy, and wife Juliana Midwin from Stockton, California.  Midwin grew up attending Catholic school at St. Frances Cabrini in San Jose, California.  She began playing volleyball in 5th grade and liked the sport.  Midwin also played soccer, piano, and gymnastics. At Archbishop Mitty High School in San Jose, California, Midwin played setter on the Women's Volleyball team and together won three consecutive CIF State Championships.  In 2010, she graduated from West Valley College.

Volleyball career

Midwin's volleyball credentials date from her high school career at Archbishop Mitty High School, where she was on the team and played with Olympic Champion Kerri Walsh Jennings. In 2000 Midwin played for the San Jose State Spartans. In 2003, Midwin was inducted into Archbishop Mitty High School Hall of fame. In that year she also joined the Association of Volleyball Professionals and got sponsored by Nike, Muscletech and Gold's Gym. Midwin always stayed active in the sport and played and hosted Beach Volleyball Tournaments at Lyford Cay in the Bahamas, while she was busy with her modeling career.

Modeling

Midwin was discovered while playing beach volleyball in Marina Del Rey by fashion designer Peter Nygård.  She began modeling for the Finnish-Canadian founder of Nygård International in 2003. Midwin worked in different locations constantly traveling between cities - New York City, Los Angeles, and Toronto. Her runway modeling included showcase clothes from Nygård signature lines such as; ALIA, Tan Jay, Westbound, Alison Dailey, and Bianca Nygård.  Midwin has been featured in a variety of Nygård International fashion shows. Her runway modeling led to work in other areas such as department store fashion shows at Dillard's across the United States. Publicly Midwin is better known by her modeling work for Playboy, where she was illustrated in a feature about the “Women of the AVP” in 2003. Further Midwin modeled for Extreme Gym and got featured on multiple TV shows, such as the Super Swank show on Travel Chanel.

Volunteer work

In 2005 Midwin ran as a candidate for grassroots neighborhood council to represent District 7 (Canals/Peninsula/South Beach/Silver Strand), one of the seven Venice geographic districts. As part of her modeling work Midwin supported the 'Susan G. Komen Breast Cancer Foundation' and visited and donated the Hurricane Katrina Victims. In her community Midwin helps in charity events like feeding the poor.

References

1978 births
American women's beach volleyball players
American people of Italian descent
American people of German descent
People from Mountain View, California
Female models from California
Living people
21st-century American women